Pascal Mariini (born 28 November 1960 in Le Cannet, France) is a French former professional footballer who played as a striker.

References

External links
Pascal Mariini profile at chamoisfc79.fr

1960 births
Living people
People from Le Cannet
French footballers
Association football forwards
SC Bastia players
Racing Besançon players
Stade Brestois 29 players
Chamois Niortais F.C. players
FC Martigues players
Gazélec Ajaccio players
USC Corte players
Ligue 1 players
Ligue 2 players
INF Vichy players
Sportspeople from Alpes-Maritimes
Footballers from Provence-Alpes-Côte d'Azur